The Ambassador of Malaysia to the French Republic is the head of Malaysia's diplomatic mission to France. The position has the rank and status of an Ambassador Extraordinary and Plenipotentiary and is based in the Embassy of Malaysia, Paris.

List of heads of mission

Ambassador of Malaya to Fifth Republic

Ambassadors of Malaysia to Fifth Republic

See also
 France–Malaysia relations

References 

 
France
Malaysia